Bylgides is a genus of marine annelids in the family Polynoidae (scale worms). The genus contains 9 species, all found in the Northern Hemisphere and from shallow inshore waters to depths of about 5000 m.

Description 

Body short, 39 segments, 16 pairs of elytra. Anterior margin of prostomium with a pair of acute anterior peaks. Lateral antennae inserted ventrally (beneath prostomium and median antenna). Palps, antennae, dorsal and ventral cirri with papillae. Notochaetae about as thick as neurochaetae. Unidentate and bidentate neurochaetae present.

Species of Bylgides are short-bodied scale worms, with 34 to 39 segments and 14 or 15 pairs of elytra; the elytra have a marginal fringe of short papillae.  The prostomium is rounded and bilobed anteriorly, with a pair of cephalic peaks.  The antennae are covered with slender papillae and are located ventral to the prostomium; the pair of lateral antennae are inserted ventral (directly beneath) the median antenna.  The neuropodium is elongate, tapering. The notochaetae are distinctly thicker than the neurochaetae.  All or most neurochaetae have long tapering capillary tips, bidentate neurochaetae are absent.

Species 
A following species of Bylgides are known as of September 2020:

Bylgides acutisetis Loshamn, 1981
Bylgides annenkovae Pettibone, 1993
Bylgides belfastensis Pettibone, 1993
Bylgides elegans (Théel, 1879)
Bylgides fuscus (Hartman & Fauchald, 1971)
Bylgides groenlandicus (Malmgren, 1867)
Bylgides macrolepidus (Moore, 1905)
Bylgides promamme (Malmgren, 1867)
Bylgides sarsi (Kinberg in Malmgren, 1866)

References 

 
Phyllodocida
Polychaete genera